Elpidiidae is a family of deep-sea sea cucumbers.

They have a translucent body with long and stout podia acting like legs. The mouth is surrounded by thick and short oral tentacles, and the dorsal part often shows pairs of elongated podia as well, pointing upwards. Some species can also show swimming appendages on top of the mouth. Sea pigs live in the darkest parts of the ocean. When introduced to warm waters, their bodies disintegrate, making them vulnerable to sudden heat changes.

Genera
The following genera are recognised in the family Elpidiidae:
Achlyonice Théel, 1879
Amperima Pawson, 1965
Ellipinion Hérouard, 1923
Elpidia Théel, 1876
Irpa Danielssen & Koren, 1878
Kolga Danielssen & Koren, 1879
Peniagone Théel, 1882
Penilpidia Gebruk, 1988
Protelpidia Gebruk, 1983
Psychrelpidia Hérouard, 1923
Psychroplanes Gebruk, 1988
Rhipidothuria Hérouard, 1901
Scotoplanes Théel, 1882

References

Echinoderm families